Pevomaysky is a rural locality (a settlement) in Novlenskoye Rural Settlement, Vologodsky District, Vologda Oblast, Russia. The population was 3 as of 2002.

Geography 
The distance to Vologda is 85 km, to Novlenskoye is 20 km. Aksenovo is the nearest rural locality.

References 

Rural localities in Vologodsky District